John Adrian Gibney Jr. (born October 27, 1951) is a Senior United States district judge of the United States District Court for the Eastern District of Virginia.

Early life and education 
Born in Coatesville, Pennsylvania, Gibney received a Bachelor of Arts degree in English from The College of William & Mary in 1973 and a Juris Doctor from the University of Virginia School of Law in 1976. From 1976 until 1978, Gibney served as a law clerk for Justice Harry L. Carrico of the Supreme Court of Virginia.

Professional career 

From 1978 until 1982, Gibney was an associate at the now-dissolved Richmond, Virginia law firm Bell, Lacy & Baliles. From 1982 until 1984, Gibney served in the office of the attorney general for the commonwealth of Virginia in the litigation section as an assistant attorney general. From 1984 until 1987, he served as an associate at the now-dissolved Richmond law firm Lacy & Mehfoud. From 1987 until 2003, Gibney served as a shareholder (partner) in the Richmond law firm Shuford, Rubin & Gibney. From 2003 until his confirmation as a federal judge, he served as a partner and a civil litigator in the Richmond law firm Thompson McMullan. From 2005 to 2010, he was an adjunct professor at the University of Richmond School of Law.

Federal judicial service 

On September 30, 2009, Virginia Senators Jim Webb and Mark Warner recommended Gibney for a seat on the United States District Court for the Eastern District of Virginia. On April 14, 2010, President Obama nominated Gibney to the seat that had been created by the retirement of Judge Robert E. Payne, who assumed senior status in May 2007. Gibney's nomination was approved by the Senate on December 16, 2010, during the lame duck session of the 111th Congress. He received his commission on December 17, 2010. He assumed senior status on November 1, 2021.

References

External links

1951 births
Living people
20th-century American lawyers
21st-century American judges
21st-century American lawyers
College of William & Mary alumni
Judges of the United States District Court for the Eastern District of Virginia
People from Chester County, Pennsylvania
United States district court judges appointed by Barack Obama
University of Richmond faculty
University of Virginia School of Law alumni
Virginia lawyers